This is a list of films produced and released by American film studio Fox Star Studios beginning in 2009 up until 2022. For subsequent releases, see List of Star Studios films.

All films listed are theatrical releases unless specified. Films labeled with a ‡ symbol signify a streaming release exclusively through Disney+ Hotstar.

2000s

2010s

2020s

See also 
 List of Star Studios films
 Star Studios

References

External links 
 

2009
Fox Star Studios
Lists of films released by Disney
Lists of films by studio